Little Victories may refer to:

 Little Victories (Beccy Cole album), 2003
 Little Victories (Strypes album), 2015
 "Little Victories" (Bob Seger song), the 1982 B-side of "Even Now"

See also
"Small Victories", an episode from the television series Stargate SG-1